Charter Oak High School is a four-year comprehensive secondary school in the Charter Oak Unified School District. It is located in the City of Covina, California, in the San Gabriel Valley east of Los Angeles. The school serves 9th, 10th, 11th and 12th graders from the communities of Covina, Azusa and Glendora. Enrollment in 2016-17 was 1,566. Charter Oak High School, which opened in 1959, is accredited by the Western Association of Schools and Colleges.

Charter Oak High School was named a California Distinguished School in 1996 and 2007  and a 2015 Gold Ribbon School.

The school also was named one of the top 1,500 high schools in the country by Newsweek magazine in 2009.

Academic programs
International Baccalaureate (IB) program: Charter Oak was the first Los Angeles County high school to adopt the rigorous IB program.
BETA (Business Educational Technology Academy)
Health and Wellness Academy: Project Lead the Way biomedical pathway program
Project Lead the Way Engineering Design and Development Academy 
Advanced Placement
Advancement Via Individual Determination (AVID)
Sports Medicine

Notable alumni

Shane Bowers, Major League Baseball player
Jason David, Retired NFL cornerback, Class of 2000
Mike Dyer, Major League Baseball player
Chuck Henry, Television Journalist - Class of 1963
Tommy Lee, drummer
Vince Neil, singer
Roger Nelson, Major League Baseball Player (Chicago White Sox, Baltimore Orioles, Kansas City Royals, Cincinnati Reds) - Class of 1962
Jim Pash, musician - Class of 1966 
Jeron Roberts (born 1976), American-Israeli basketball player
Keith Smith, NFL fullback - Class of 2010
Ron Wilson, The Surfaris drummer/singer  Wipe Out Surfer Joe - Class of 1963

Enrollment
Enrollment in the 2016–2017 school year is 1,566. The majority of students are Hispanic, with a large white minority and smaller minorities of African Americans and Asian Americans.

References

External links

School district website
High schools in Los Angeles County, California
Educational institutions established in 1959
Public high schools in California
1959 establishments in California